Events in the year 1952 in Germany.

Incumbents
President –  Theodor Heuss 
Chancellor –  Konrad Adenauer

Events 	
 Liquidation of German company IG Farben started.
 April 25 - The three states of Württemberg-Baden, Württemberg-Hohenzollern and South Baden merge to form the modern southwestern state of Baden-Württemberg.
 May 26 - Porsche Club Hohensyburg is founded.
 June 12 to 25 - 2nd Berlin International Film Festival
 June 24: German newspaper BILD was founded.

Births
 12 January - Florian Havemann, German judge, painter and composer	
 19 January - Nadiuska, German television actress
 22 January - Aloys Wobben, German businessman
 31 January - Jan Hofer, German journalist
 13 February - Jörg Hacker, German  microbiologist
 17 February - Karin Büttner-Janz, German gymnast and physician
 18 February - Ulrich Eicke, German canoeist
 22 February - Thomas Wessinghage, German athlete
 3 March - Wolfgang Kubicki, German football player
 18 March - Michaela May, German actress
 24 March - Reinhard Genzel, German astrophysicist, recipient of the Nobel Prize in Physics
 4 April - Rosemarie Ackermann, German high jumper
 29 April - Barbara Hendricks, German politician
 10 May - Ulrich Hahnen, German politician 
 10 May - Roland Kaiser, German singer
 12 May - Norbert Stolzenburg, German footballer and manager
 17 May - Bernhard Brink, German singer
 2 June - Hildegard Krekel, German actress (died 2013)
 12 June - Cornelia Hanisch, German fencer
 26 July - Heiner Brand, German handball player
 28 July - Cordt Schnibben, German author and journalist
 6 August - Christoph Biemann, German writer
 19 August - Bodo Hombach, German politician
 29 August - Falk Hoffmann, German diver
 6 September - Dominik Graf, German film director
 21 September - Anneliese Michel, German student (died 1976)
 2 October - Peter Koslowski German philosopher and academic (died 2012)
 28 October - Thomas Dinger, German musician (died 2002)
 21 November - Corny Littmann, German entrepreneur, entertainer, theater owner
 24 November - Ilja Richter, German actor, voice actor, television presenter, singer and author
 26 November - Jan Philipp Reemtsma, German literary scholar and political activist
 3 December - Bruno Jonas, German Kabarett artist and actor
 17 December - Jochen Bachfeld, German boxer
 undated - Ernst Stötzner, German actor

Deaths
 22 January - Alexander Behm, German physicist (born 1880)
 25 January - Aloys, 7th Prince of Löwenstein-Wertheim-Rosenberg, German politician (born 1871)
 23 February - Heinrich von Vietinghoff, German general (born 1887)
 15 April - Ludwig Kaas, German politician (born 1881)
 12 June - Michael von Faulhaber, German cardinal of Roman Catholic Church (born 1869)
 3 July - Carl Tanzler, radiologic technologist (born 1877)
 4 July - Karl Platen, German actor (born 1877)
 6 July - Gertrud Wolle, German actress (born 1891)
 23 July - Carl Severing, German politician (born 1875)
 31 July - Waldemar Bonsels, German writer (born 1880)
 12 August - Richard Otto, German physician (born 1872)
 13 August - Wilm Hosenfeld, officer (born 1895)
 18 December - Ernst Stromer, German paleontologist (born 1871)

References

 
1950s in Germany
Years of the 20th century in Germany
Germany
Germany